Rio Turbio Railway or Ramal Ferro Industrial de Río Turbio (RFIRT) is a   gauge railway that crosses the breadth of Patagonia, from the mining township of Rio Turbio on the Chilean border to Rio Gallegos on the Atlantic Coast.

It was built in the early 1950s to haul coal from Argentina's only coal mine at Rio Turbio to the port of Rio Gallegos for ongoing transportation by ship to Buenos Aires where it was used to generate electricity.  850,000 tons of coal were transported each year in the line’s heyday in the 1960s.

Traffic gradually declined through the 1970s and 1980s.  Notwithstanding, in the late 1980s a large investment was made in the development of a new coal export terminal at Punta Loyola near the mouth of the Rio Gallegos (River Gallegos) on its southern bank, a few kilometres downstream of the township.  The rail connection was not completed until 1996 when the first trains reached the port.

In 1994 the Argentinian government had “privatised” the railway by selling a 10 year concession to a consortium of investors, the Yacimientos Carboníferos Río Turbio (YCRT), to take over the operation of the railway.

YCRT withdrew the steam locomotive fleet, replacing it with three second-hand diesel-hydraulic locomotives imported from Romania.  These quickly proved unreliable and expensive to maintain, and it was not long before two of them were taken out of service.

By 2005, the line had ceased to operate, but its infrastructure was left in place in case economic circumstances changed to justify reinstating rail haulage operations.

Occasional trains were run over the line, but in 2022 it was reported that only 1000 tons were transported to Punta Loyola, the remainder of the mine's production being used in the township's power station.
  
Several proposals were put forward to develop Rio Turbio into a “steam centre” to attract tourists.  These included a 2004 plan to build a new tourist railway from Rio Turbio across the Chilean border to the tourist port of Puerto Natales on the Pacific coast.  Two or three of the Santa Fe locomotives were overhauled for this purpose and it was even proposed that they might resume haulage of coal trains, given their ability to consume the indigenous fuel. However, by 2022 these plans had come to nothing and there appears to be little prospect of the railway being put back into operation.

Locomotives 

The line was famed for its diminutive Santa Fe (2-10-2) locomotives, 20 of which were built by Mitsubishi between 1956 and 1964.  In the 1960s the renowned locomotive engineer Livio Dante Porta was appointed General Manager of the railway, whereupon he carried out a number of modifications to several of the locomotives, which proved themselves capable of hauling trains weighing 1700 tons over the winding and poorly constructed track – an astonishing figure for any steam locomotive, let alone ones weighing only 48 tons and having an adhesive weight of just 38 tons.

References

Railway lines in Argentina